SS Polynesien was a French passenger ship that was sunk on 10 August 1918 in the Mediterranean Sea  off Valletta, Malta, by a torpedo launched by , captained by Eberhard Weichold.

The ship was en route from Bizerte, Tunisia, to Thessaloniki, Greece. On board was a detachment of cadets and personnel of the Royal Serbian Army, including Serb heroine Milunka Savić. Most of the cadets survived the sinking, as did Savić, but eleven crew members and six passengers died.

The survivors were taken to Malta and recuperated at Cottonera Hospital.

See also

References

External links 

http://www.maritimequest.com/daily_event_archive/2010/08_august/10_ss_polynesien.htm

1890 ships
Maritime incidents in 1918
Ships sunk by German submarines in World War I
Shipwrecks of Malta
World War I shipwrecks in the Mediterranean Sea
Ships built in France